Takia Nicole Starks (born January 16, 1986) is a shooting guard. She formerly played for the Perth Lynx of the Women's National Basketball League. Born in Houston, Texas, she played college basketball at Texas A&M. Starks became AMM all-time leading scorer during her career, scoring 1977 points. She is currently second on the all-time scoring list for the school.

College honors and awards
2008 Timeout 4 HIV/AIDS Tournament MVP
2008 Preseason All-Big 12 team
2008–09 Preseason Sporting News First Team All-America
2008 Associated Press All-America Honorable Mention
2008 State Farm/WBCA All-America Finalist
2008 State Farm/WBCA All-Region Team
2008 NCAA Oklahoma City Regional All-Tournament Team
2008 John R. Wooden Award Candidate
2008 Naismith Trophy Award Candidate
2008 Big 12 Tournament Most Outstanding Player
2008 Big 12 All-Tournament Team
2008 All-Big 12 First Team by the league’s coaches
2008 All-Big 12 First Team by The Dallas Morning News
2008 All-Big 12 Second Team by the Waco Tribune-Herald
2007 Paradise Jam St. John Division All-Tournament Team
The 19th all-time player to reach 1,000 career points at A&M
2007 All-Big 12 First Team by the league’s coaches
2007 All-Big 12 First Team by The Dallas Morning News
2007 All-Big 12 First Team by the Waco Tribune-Herald
Big 12 Player of the Week (1/15/07) 
2006 National All-Freshman Team by Women’s Basketball News Service
2006 Big 12 All-Rookie Team by the league’s coaches
2006 Big 12 All-Newcomer Team by Dallas Morning News
2006 Big 12 All-Freshman Team by Kansas City Star
2006 Big 12 All-Freshman Team by Waco Tribune-Herald
2005 Duel in the Desert Classic All-Tournament Team
Big 12 Rookie of the Week (12/19/05) 
Big 12 Rookie of the Week (12/5/05) 

Reference:

Texas A&M statistics

Source

Professional career
Starks signed with the Perth Lynx on July 30, 2009.

Personal
Starks' father died of cancer on August 13, 2009, two weeks after she signed with the Perth Lynx.  Her mom is a U.S. Army reservist and military police officer. Starks is the cousin of former NBA player John Starks.

Notes

References

External links
Texas A&M Aggies bio

1986 births
Living people
American expatriate basketball people in Australia
American expatriate basketball people in Finland
American expatriate basketball people in Switzerland
Basketball players from Houston
Point guards
Texas A&M Aggies women's basketball players